The Dennis Loline was a low-height double-decker bus manufactured by Dennis between 1958 and 1966.

History

The Dennis Loline was basically a license-built Bristol Lodekka, being primarily supplied to municipal, private sector British Electric Traction fleets and independent bus companies in the United Kingdom, during a period when Bristol's sales were restricted to state-owned bus companies.

Production was to cease in 1962, however this was quickly reversed and it continued to be made until 1966.

Three versions of the Dennis Loline were built: the Loline with rear entrance, Loline II with front entrance and the later Loline III with a revised front grille in front of the radiator and a different clutch and constant mesh gearbox.

In 1961, Barton Transport commissioned No. 861, which had lowbridge bodywork on a Loline chassis, and was the lowest ever roofed British double-decker. It was specially designed to pass under an ultra low railway bridge at Sawley Junction, now , station.

Aldershot & District Traction operated the largest number of Dennis Loline buses.

China Motor Bus in Hong Kong put one Dennis Loline into service in 1963. It was the first double-decker bus on Hong Kong Island.

References

Further reading
 Brown, S. (2013). The Lodekka Alternatives. Ian Allan Publishing.

External links

 Aldershot & District Bus Interest Group

Loline
Double-decker buses
Half-cab buses
Vehicles introduced in 1956